The 2005 Tour du Haut Var was the 37th edition of the Tour du Haut Var cycle race and was held on 19 February 2005. The race started and finished in Draguignan. The race was won by Philippe Gilbert.

General classification

References

2005
2005 in road cycling
2005 in French sport
February 2005 sports events in France